Uhry may refer to:

People
 Alfred Uhry (born 1936), American playwright and screenwriter
 Jonathan Uhry Newman (1927–1991), American attorney and judge

Places
 Uhry, Horodok Raion, Ukraine
 Uhry (Königslutter), Germany